Sir Mordaunt Martin, 4th Baronet (c. 1740 – 24 September 1815) was son of Sir Roger Martin, 3rd Baronet and Sophia Mordaunt. He inherited his baronetcy from his father, who was the third Martin Baronet, upon his death in 1762. He lived in Burnham Market in Norfolk

Career

Sir Mordaunt was a marshal of the vice admiralty court in Jamaica.

In 1808 he purchased Burnham Westgate Hall, which he built onto. In particular he built a number of farm buildings. A keen agriculturalist, he wrote many letters and articles on the relative benefits of the mangel wurzel as a crop and is documented as the first person to introduce the plant, as well as sainfoin to the county and greatly improved the growth of potatoes and other vegetables.
On his death he left the hall-described by White as "a hand-some mansion, beautified with pleasure grounds and shrubberies, and situated near the church", to his son and heir Roger

Personal life
On 29 July 1765  Sir Mordaunt married Everilda-Dorothea Smith (1743 – 21 September 1800), daughter of the Reverend William Smith rector of Burnham Market and by her had three sons and seven daughters:
 Sophia Elizbetha Martin (c. 1766 – 18 November 1827), died unmarried.
 Everilda-Dorothea Martin (5 June 1767 – 27 November 1839), married Rev. Thomas Bernard and by him had five sons.
 Mordaunt Martin (February 1769 – 25 November 1769), died an infant.
 Anna-Maria Martin (c. 1770 – 1853), married Rev. John Glasse rector of Burnham.
 Louisa Mary Ann Martin (baptised 20 August 1771) married Captain Isaac Wolley, RN.
 Mordaunt Martin (baptised 29 October 1772 - buried 10 June 1773), died an infant.
 Caroline Martin (1773 – 3 June 1848), married Rev. James Monroe of Monken Hadley in Middlesex and by him had one son.
 Frances Martin (c. 1775 – 27 July 1802), died unmarried.
 Sir Roger Martin, 5th Baronet (22 February 1778 – 15 December 1854), married Mary Ann Clark and was without issue.
 Catherina Martin

Governess to the family's first six daughters from 1775 to 1780 was a very young Jane Arden, the first friend of Mary Wollstonecraft. She later set up a school and published educational works as Jane Gardiner. She named her daughter Everilda, very likely after Lady Martin. Governesses were often isolated and oppressed, but the Martins treated her well – on a return visit, "more as a daughter than as an humble 'gouvernante' ... I am in the very height of enjoyment in this charming family, their society is so refined, so intellectual!"

Burnham was within visiting distance of Houghton Hall, then in the possession of Horace Walpole; the Martins took their former employee to admire the famous collection of paintings there.

Sir Mordaunt remarried on 4 August 1808 to Catherine (21 July 1759 – 29 April 1825), daughter of Rev. Armine Styleman and widow of Rev. Edward North, with whom he had no children and who survived him. He died on 24 September 1815, when his title passed to his eldest son. Sir Mordaunt was buried in Burnham Westgate Church with his first wife Everilda-Dorothea.

References

 
 
 
 
 
 
 
 
 
 
 
 

1740 births
1815 deaths
Baronets in the Baronetage of England
People from Burnham Market